The Kelly Family Home is a historic structure at 657 S. Main St. in Dayton, Ohio. It was added to the National Register of Historic Places on June 30, 1975.

Historic uses 
The house at 657 South Main Street was originally the home of John S. Kelly. The home was built by Kelley's father in law, Andrew Kinninger who was a local contractor.

Kelly was born in Maryland in 1840 and moved to Dayton in 1856. Kelly had been a managing partner of a local bakery and opened his own grocery store. John Kelly died in 1910 and his widow continued living in the house until she died in 1924.

See also
 National Register of Historic Places listings in Dayton, Ohio

References

National Register of Historic Places in Montgomery County, Ohio
Houses on the National Register of Historic Places in Ohio
Houses in Dayton, Ohio